is a farming simulation role-playing game by Marvelous Entertainment released for Nintendo's Wii console. It is the second title for the Wii in the Story of Seasons series, and has the same characters as Harvest Moon: Tree of Tranquility. It features many animals, all of which the player can ride, including circus animals.

Harvest Moon: Animal Parade is also the last entry in the series to be produced by series creator Yasuhiro Wada.

Story
The player begins on the island of Castanet and discovers that a divine tree which once stood in the middle of the Harvest Goddess' pond has begun to weaken, the creatures are beginning to leave the island, and the five bells have lost their power. Only the strength of the Harvest King can revive the earth and bring the tree back to life, but he is nowhere to be found. Aided by a Harvest Sprite named Finn, the player must help the other Harvest Sprites ring the five bells to restore the elements to the island, bring the Harvest King back to the island, and have him help revive the Goddess' Tree, while at the same time running a large farm plantation, marry and have a family, and befriend and help townsfolks (the same characters from Tree of Tranquility, along with a few new characters). The player must grow and sell their crops to make money to buy things and furnish their ranch house. There are many crops to grow, including beans, tomatoes, potatoes, and many more.

Children
Some time after the player is married, the wife will have a child. She gives birth in the town clinic, while the husband stays in the waiting room. Afterwards, the nurse will present them with their new son or daughter. The player will be able to play with their child while he or she is a toddler. There are special events in the child's life such as "Crawling", "Walking", "Talking", and "Growing Up."

One of the benefits of marriage is that the player can ask their spouse and children to handle some of the farm responsibilities. Another benefit of marriage is that they can take their spouse and children to festivals by taking them on walks.

Unlike Tree of Tranquility and other Harvest Moon titles, apart from Harvest Moon SNES, the player is allowed two children to their family instead of the previous only child option.

Depending on the person the player marries, their child can have different attributes and types of personalities. They can have the same hair and eye color as the player's spouse, and possess some of these traits based on their spouse's own personality: Quiet, Scholarly, Fiery, and Romantic.

Animals
Although some animals from Harvest Moon: Tree of Tranquility return, the official website describes the game as feeling like a circus. The animals are divided into four categories: circus, livestock, poultry, and pets.  Circus animals can't be kept as pets, however. Once again, Horses are not the only  ride-able animal. If the player has 5 hearts or more with any farm animal (excluding chickens, ducks and silkworms), they can ride them around. All the ride-able animals have different walking/running speed. Horses and ostriches are the fastest, followed by the sheep and goat, and then the cow. The higher their heart level, the faster they go. The livestock (excluding ostriches, ducks, chickens and silkworms) can be different colors. Cows can be brown, black or white and black, horses can be white, brown, grey or black. Sheep can be either white or black, goats can also be white or black.

As with previous games, cows and goats produce milk, cheese and butter, while chickens, ostriches and ducks produce eggs and mayonnaise. In addition, sheep, who used to produce wool exclusively, can produce milk, cheese and butter as well. Silkworms, which were introduced in Tree of Tranquility, produce silk cocoons, that can be shipped as is, or turned into silk yarn. In addition to being able to buy young animals from Hanna, such as foals and calves, the player can also buy the adult forms of these animals, but at more of a cost.

Reception

The game received "generally favorable reviews" according to the review aggregation website Metacritic. In Japan, Famitsu gave it a score of one seven, one eight, and two sevens for a total of 29 out of 40.

See also
List of Wii games

References

External links
  
  
 
 

2008 video games
Animal Parade
Marvelous Entertainment
Video games developed in Japan
Video games featuring protagonists of selectable gender
Wii games
Wii-only games
Rising Star Games games
Single-player video games
Natsume (company) games